"I'm the One Mama Warned You About" is a song written by Mickey James and Gayle Zeiler, and recorded by American country music artist Mickey Gilley. It was released in January 1985 as the second and final single from his album Too Good to Stop Now. The song reached number 10 on the U.S. Billboard Hot Country Singles chart and number 10 on the Canadian RPM Country Tracks chart in Canada.

Chart performance

References

1985 singles
1985 songs
Mickey Gilley songs
Song recordings produced by John Boylan (record producer)
Epic Records singles